The Bishop of Salford is the Ordinary of the Roman Catholic Diocese of Salford in the Province of Liverpool, England.

With the gradual abolition of the legal restrictions on the activities of Catholics in England and Wales in the early 19th century, Rome decided to proceed to bridge the gap of the centuries from Queen Elizabeth I by instituting Catholic dioceses on the regular historical pattern. On 29 September 1850, Pope Pius IX issued the Bull Universalis Ecclesiae which created thirteen new dioceses which did not formally claim any continuity with the pre-Elizabethan English dioceses of which one of these was the diocese of Salford and went on to take up the reins of part of the former Vicariate Apostolic of the Lancashire District.

In the early period from 1850 the diocese was a suffragan of the Metropolitan See of Westminster, but a further development was its assignment under Pope Pius X, on 28 October 1911, to a newly created Province of Liverpool.

At the diocese's creation the territory assigned to it was the hundreds of Salford and Blackburn.

The see is in the Salford area of Greater Manchester, where the Bishop's cathedra or seat is located in the Salford Cathedral, which was dedicated on 14 June 1890.

The Bishop's residence is Wardley Hall, Worsley, Greater Manchester.

The current bishop is John Arnold, formerly an Auxiliary Bishop of the Archdiocese of Westminster. He was appointed by Pope Francis to succeed Terence Brain as the 11th Bishop of Salford on 30 September 2014 and was installed on 8 December 2014.

List of bishops

Diocesan bishops of Salford

Auxiliary bishops of Salford 
There have been two auxiliary bishops of the Diocese of Salford who assisted the diocesan bishop of Salford in overseeing the diocese: 
 John Stephen Vaughan, appointed on 13 July 1909 and consecrated on 15 August 1909; died in office on 4 December 1925.
 Geoffrey Burke, appointed on 26 May 1967 and consecrated on 29 June 1967; retired on 12 September 1988 and died on 13 October 1999.

See also 
 Diocese of Salford churches

References

 
Roman Catholic Diocese of Salford